John Drury (Drewery, alias Salisbury) (d. 1446) was a Canon of Windsor from 1442–1446.

Career

He was appointed:
Vicar of Northall, Middlesex 1386
Rector of Stanford Rivers and Dengy, Essex
Rector of Bishops Stortford, Hertfordshire
Rector of Kilmersdon
Precentor of St Paul's Cathedral 1397 - 1442
Prebendary of Neasden in St Paul's  1400 - 1442
Prebendary of Exeter

He was appointed to the twelfth stall in St George's Chapel, Windsor Castle in 1442, and held the stall until 1446.

Notes 

1446 deaths
Canons of Windsor
Year of birth missing